Lakhmu Bhawani (3 April 1917 – 26 September 1988) was an Indian politician. He was elected to the Lok Sabha, the lower house of the Parliament of India from Bastar, Madhya Pradesh as an  Independent.

Bhawani died in the Bastar district on 26 September 1988, at the age of 71.

References

External links
 Official biographical sketch on the Parliament of India website

1917 births
1988 deaths
Independent politicians in India
India MPs 1962–1967
Lok Sabha members from Madhya Pradesh